Anthene nigeriae, the false hairtail or Nigerian ciliate blue, is a butterfly in the family Lycaenidae. It is found in the Gambia, Sierra Leone, Burkina Faso, Guinea, Ivory Coast, Ghana, Togo, Nigeria, the Democratic Republic of the Congo (Kabinda, Maniema and Lualaba), southern Sudan, Uganda, western Kenya, western Tanzania, Malawi, Zambia (the Copperbelt and eastwards) and eastern Zimbabwe. The habitat consists of forest margins, open areas in Guinea savanna and coastal scrub.

Adults are on wing in mid-summer.

The larvae feed on Acacia abyssinica, Acacia hockii and Dichrostachys species. They are associated with the ant species Crematogaster bequaerti var. saga. The larvae burrow into the thick fleshy stems of the terminal shoots of their host plant. Young larvae are dirty brownish white. Later, they become green and brown, and finally they turn black with grey markings when full grown.

References

Butterflies described in 1905
Anthene